Melanodrymia brightae is a species of sea snail, a marine gastropod mollusk in the family Melanodrymiidae.

References

Melanodrymiidae
Gastropods described in 1993